Strategic Air Command is a 1955 American military aviation film starring James Stewart and June Allyson, directed by Anthony Mann, and released by Paramount Pictures. It was the first of four Hollywood films that depicted the role of the Strategic Air Command in the Cold War era.

Strategic Air Command was the second film released in Paramount's new widescreen format, VistaVision, in color by Technicolor and Perspecta pseudo-stereo sound. It would also be Stewart and Mann's eighth and final collaboration and the last of three films that paired Jimmy Stewart and June Allyson, the others being The Stratton Story and The Glenn Miller Story.

Plot
In 1951, Robert "Dutch" Holland (James Stewart) is a professional baseball player with the St. Louis Cardinals. A B-29 bomber pilot during World War II, he retains a commission as a lieutenant colonel in the United States Air Force Reserve, but is on inactive, non-drilling status. During spring training at Al Lang Field in St. Petersburg, Florida, he is recalled to active duty for 21 months. He reports to his posting at Carswell Air Force Base, a bomber base in Fort Worth, Texas, to qualify in the Convair B-36. He arrives in a civilian business suit, for which he is rebuked by General Hawkes (Frank Lovejoy), the commander of SAC, and replies that his uniforms are "the wrong color" (implying he has been inactive at least since the Air Force replaced the brown United States Army Air Forces uniform with a distinctive blue service dress uniform, which had occurred three years earlier in 1949). The General's character is clearly patterned after the real SAC commander of the time, General Curtis LeMay.

Dutch is given a staff job with the bombardment wing at Carswell that involves a lot of flying. He soon has a B-36 crew of his own, selecting a former World War II colleague as his flight engineer, and becomes enamored with both flying and the role of SAC in deterring war. He is joined by his wife, Sally (June Allyson), who had not bargained on being an Air Force wife, and who struggles with his repeated absences and the dangers of flying. On any given night, Dutch might find his aircraft on airborne alert far from the continental United States, in secret, only telling his wife when he returns days later. Even so, Sally tells Dutch that she is happy as long as they can be together, no matter what he decides to do with his life.

The B-36 is a complex aircraft when introduced, but improvements are being worked on all the time. One challenge was leakage from the fuel tanks, but a new fix is introduced to address this once and for all. On their next flight, Dutch's crew has to fly their B-36 from Carswell AFB to Thule Air Base, Greenland. The fix does not work and one of the engines bursts into flame, causing the entire left wing to catch fire. The crew is forced to abandon the aircraft and bail out over the ice and snow of Greenland before arriving at Thule. Dutch and his radar navigator stay on board for a forced landing, which causes Dutch to injure his right shoulder.

Dutch becomes a favorite of General Hawkes, and he is rewarded with a revised assignment flying the new Boeing B-47 Stratojet at MacDill Air Force Base, Tampa, Florida, across the bay from St. Petersburg where his old baseball team continues to conduct its spring training. Promoted to "full bird" colonel and made deputy wing commander of his B-47 wing at MacDill AFB, Dutch decides, to Sally's displeasure, to remain in the Air Force, rather than return to baseball at the end of his active duty obligation.

On a full B-47 wing deployment exercise that involves flying nonstop from MacDill to Yokota Air Base, Japan, they encounter severe wind and storms. Low on fuel, they divert to Kadena Air Base, Okinawa. As they prepare to land, Dutch realizes that his shoulder injury from the B-36 crash was worse than he thought, and his arm is almost immobile. He is unable to operate the engine power levers (throttles) during final landing phase, and he has to rely on his co-pilot to do so, while Dutch works the flight controls with his left arm and two feet.

This injury not only bars him from further flying and causes the Air Force to medically discharge him, but it also appears to threaten his baseball career. General Hawkes suggests that he would make an excellent team manager.

Cast
 James Stewart as Lieutenant Colonel (later Colonel) Robert R. "Dutch" Holland
 June Allyson as Sally Holland
 Frank Lovejoy as General Ennis C. Hawkes
James Millican as Major General 'Rusty' Castle
 Bruce Bennett as Colonel (later Brigadier General) Espy
 Barry Sullivan as Lieutenant Colonel Rocky Samford
 Alex Nicol as Major I. K. "Ike" Knowland
 Jay C. Flippen as Tom Dolan, manager of the St. Louis Cardinals
 Harry Morgan as Master Sergeant Bible, a B-36 flight engineer.

Production

In real life, during World War II, Stewart had been a B-17 instructor pilot, a B-24 squadron commander, and a bomb group operations officer, completing 20 combat missions. At the time of filming, Stewart, much like the character he portrays, was also a colonel in the Air Force Reserve, serving with the Strategic Air Command when on duty and at the time was qualified as a pilot on the B-47, although much of the B-47 flying was performed by his friend and fellow Air Force pilot, Maj. (later Col.) A.W. Blizzard, Jr. Stewart's military service and lifelong interest in aviation greatly influenced the making of the film. He pushed for an authentic but sympathetic portrayal of the Strategic Air Command, which led Paramount to put together a strong cast of Hollywood veterans and production people including June Allyson, Frank Lovejoy, director Anthony Mann, and the top stunt pilot of the day, Paul Mantz. The film accurately portrays (from the perspective of the 1951 starting point of the script) the duties and responsibilities of an Air Force strategic bomber pilot, and the demands such service places on family life.

The film includes dramatic aerial photography, credited to Thomas Tutwiler, for which it was awarded a special citation by the American National Board of Review. It is also the only motion picture to highlight the Convair B-36 (depicted in the theatrical release poster), the largest mass-produced piston-powered aircraft ever built, and the first bomber for the hydrogen bomb. The propeller-driven B-36 was then near the end of its service life and was about to be replaced by the jet-powered B-47 Stratojet, followed by the Boeing B-52 Stratofortress. The aerial footage was accompanied by a dramatic and soaring musical score composed by Victor Young.

The film was made with the full cooperation of the U.S. Air Force, and it was filmed partly on location at MacDill Air Force Base, Tampa, Florida; Lowry Air Force Base, Colorado, and Carswell Air Force Base, Texas.

The baseball scenes were filmed with the cooperation of the St. Louis Cardinals at their spring training home of Al Lang Field in St. Petersburg, Florida, just across Tampa Bay from MacDill AFB.

Stewart's character is based on the real-life military career and an actual mission flown by Brigadier General Clifford Schoeffler, who crashed during an Arctic B-36 mission and survived. Brigadier General Schoeffler was on site at Carswell Air Force Base during the filming of Strategic Air Command as a consultant.

Some commentators have speculated that the plot was inspired by Boston Red Sox legend Ted Williams, a World War II veteran, who was recalled for Korean War service as a U.S. Marine Corps aviator, at the height of his baseball career.

Reception
The Storz Mansion in Omaha, Nebraska, was the scene of opulent parties celebrating the film. Its premiere was held in Omaha, the home of Offutt AFB and of SAC Headquarters. The premiere party was held at the Mansion, with guests that included Stewart and Allyson, as well as the Strategic Air Command commander, General Curtis LeMay.

Shot in the new VistaVision process, the film was the sixth highest-grossing film of 1955. Critics were lukewarm about the performances of all except for Stewart, who was called "capable", "charming", and "competent". 
Public reaction centered on the spectacular aerial footage, so much so that the B-36 and B-47 aircraft were arguably the real stars of the film. Its release led to a 25 percent increase in Air Force enlistments.

Strategic Air Command was followed by two additional military aviation films that were also supportive of SAC's mission, Bombers B-52 (1957), and A Gathering of Eagles (1963).

The B-47 cockpit used in the film is now on display at the March Field Air Museum at March Air Reserve Base (former March AFB) in Riverside, California.

Awards
 1955 Academy Award Nomination: Best Motion Picture Story (Beirne Lay Jr.)
 1955 National Board of Review, USA: Special Citation to recognize the film's aerial photography

Home media

In October 2016, Strategic Air Command was released by Olive Films on Blu-ray.

See also
 List of American films of 1955

References

Notes

Citations

Bibliography

 Coe, Jonathan. James Stewart: Leading Man. London: Bloomsbury, 1994. .
 Dewey, Donald. James Stewart: A Biography. Atlanta: Turner Publishing Inc., 1996. .
 Jacobsen, Meyers K. Convair B-36: A Comprehensive History of America's "Big Stick". Atglen, Pennsylvania: Schiffer Military History, 1997. .
 Jones, Ken D., Arthur F. McClure and Alfred E. Twomey. The Films of James Stewart. New York: Castle Books, 1970.
 Thomas, Tony. A Wonderful Life: The Films and Career of James Stewart. Secaucus, New Jersey: Citadel Press, 1988. .

External links
 
 
 
 
 Entry at impdb.com
 Strategic Air Command (1955) on Rotten Tomatoes

1955 films
Cold War aviation films
Films scored by Victor Young
Films about nuclear war and weapons
Films directed by Anthony Mann
Paramount Pictures films
Film
Films about the United States Air Force
Films produced by Samuel J. Briskin
1950s English-language films
1950s American films
Films set in Fort Worth, Texas